Jane Moraa Omoro (born 12 September 1974) is a Kenyan long-distance runner who competed in cross country, track and road running events, up to the marathon. She was active from 1993 to 2007, with most of her success coming in the 1990s.

Omoro was a five time participant for Kenya at the IAAF World Cross Country Championships and won a team medal each time, including the women's team title in 1998. Individually, she placed in the top eight of the women's race on two occasions. She was a double gold medallist at the East African Cross Country Championships in 1999. She became national champion at the Kenyan Cross Country Championships in 1997.

She was the bronze medallist in the 10,000 metres at the 1994 Commonwealth Games. She was the silver medallist at the 1998 IAAF World Road Relay Championships and participated at the 1999 IAAF World Half Marathon Championships. She was highly successful on the American road racing circuit, taking wins at the Bay to Breakers, Bolder Boulder, Lilac Bloomsday Run and Cherry Blossom Ten Mile Run, among others. In marathon running, she was a two-time winner at the Mombasa Marathon and also won the Beirut Marathon.

Personal bests
5000 metres – 15:42.00 min (1997)
10,000 metres – 32:13.01 min (1994)
10K run – 31:06 min (1994)
Half marathon – 70:36 min (2003)
Marathon – 2:38:55	(2005)

All information from All-Athletics profile

International competitions

National titles
Kenyan Cross Country Championships
Senior race: 1997

Road race wins
Steamboat Classic: 1994
Great Cow Harbor 10K: 1994
Arturo Barrios Invitational: 1997
Bay to Breakers: 1997, 1998
Phoenix 10K: 1997, 1998
Crescent City Classic: 1998
Bolder Boulder: 1998
Wharf to Wharf Race: 1998
Lilac Bloomsday Run: 1998, 1999, 2000
Cherry Blossom Ten Mile Run: 1999
Azalea Trail Run: 2000
Mombasa Marathon: 2002, 2004
Hastings Half Marathon: 2003
Peterborough Half Marathon: 2003
Beirut Marathon: 2005

References

Road race wins
Jane Omoro Moraa. Association of Road Racing Statisticians. Retrieved on 2016-09-04.

External links

Living people
1974 births
Kenyan female long-distance runners
Kenyan female marathon runners
Commonwealth Games bronze medallists for Kenya
Commonwealth Games medallists in athletics
Athletes (track and field) at the 1994 Commonwealth Games
Kenyan female cross country runners
20th-century Kenyan women
Medallists at the 1994 Commonwealth Games